Lydia Grace Jordan (born June 12, 1994) is an American actress best known for her role as Alice in the 2008 film  Doubt.

Filmography

External links

Profile in Child Starlets

1994 births
Actresses from New York City
American film actresses
American television actresses
Living people
21st-century American women